Naushki (Naashkhi) is an urban locality (an urban-type settlement) in Kyakhtinsky District of the Republic of Buryatia, Russia, located near the border with Mongolia,  from the town of Kyakhta. As of the 2010 Census, its population was 3,409.

Administrative and municipal status
Within the framework of administrative divisions, the urban-type settlement (inhabited locality) of Naushki is incorporated within Kyakhtinsky District as Naushki Urban-Type Settlement (an administrative division of the district). As a municipal division, Naushki Urban-Type Settlement is incorporated within Kyakhtinsky Municipal District as Naushkinskoye Urban Settlement.

Transportation
Naushki is Russia's border station on the Trans-Mongolian Railway, which connects Russia with Mongolia and continues on to China. The counterpart station on the Mongolian side is Sükhbaatar.

References

Notes

Sources

Urban-type settlements in Buryatia
Populated places in Kyakhtinsky District
Mongolia–Russia border crossings